Shi Zhiyong (born 10 October 1993) is a Chinese weightlifter, two time Olympic Champion, three time World Champion and four time Asian Champion competing in the 69 kg category until 2018 and 73 kg starting in 2018 after the International Weightlifting Federation reorganized the categories.

Shi was born Shi Lei (Chinese: 石磊), but his coach Zhan Xugang gave him the new name after former Olympic Champion Shi Zhiyong.

He holds the current world records in the -73 kg class for the snatch, clean and jerk and total, and has set 13 world records.

Career

Olympics

In 2016 he competed at the 2016 Summer Olympics in the 69 kg category. After the snatch portion of the competition he was in second place, trailing Daniyar İsmayilov by a single kg. Shi was able to beat Daniyar İsmayilov by two kg in the clean & jerk portion of the competition, lifting 190 kg over Daniyar's 188 kg, this gave him a total of 352 kg and an Olympic gold medal.

In 2021 he competed at the 2020 Summer Olympics in the 73 kg category. He set an Olympic record in both the snatch and clean & jerk portions, with lifts of 166 kg and 198 kg respectively, thereby setting the world record. Following this victory, he is now an Olympic champion in 2 weight categories.

World Championships
In 2015 he competed at his first World Championships. After the snatch portion he finished third, two kg behind Oleg Chen and Daniyar İsmayilov. In the clean and jerk portion he lifted 190 kg, which gave him a total of 348 kg and a gold medal in the clean & jerk and total.

In 2018 the International Weightlifting Federation reorganized the categories and Shi competed in the newly created 73 kg category. He put on a dominating display, earning gold in the snatch with a new world record of 164 kg, this gave him an 8 kg lead over second place. During the clean & jerk, he also won gold by out lifting Won Jeong-sik by 1 kg to set a new world record clean & jerk of 196 kg. He won gold medals in all lifts and finished with a total of 360 kg, a full 12 kg over the silver medalist Won Jeong-sik.

Coming into the 2019 World Weightlifting Championships, he was the heavy favorite in the 73 kg category. During the snatch portion of the competition, he was the last competitor to attempt a lift after Bozhidar Andreev completed a 157 kg lift. With his first lift of 160 kg he secured the gold medal in the snatch, and added two more successful lifts to increase his snatch to 166 kg. Coming into the clean & jerk portion he was 9 kg ahead of the silver medalist Andreev, he completed his first lift of 190 kg which gave him a 356 kg total. After O Kang-chol completed his final lift, Shi clinched the gold medal in the total. His final lift was a world record lift of 197 kg, which also set a new world record in the total with 363 kg.

Major results

CWR: Current world record
WR: World record

References

External links

1993 births
Living people
People from Guilin
Chinese male weightlifters
Olympic weightlifters of China
Olympic medalists in weightlifting
2016 Olympic gold medalists for China
Weightlifters at the 2016 Summer Olympics
World Weightlifting Championships medalists
Weightlifters from Guangxi
Weightlifters at the 2020 Summer Olympics
Medalists at the 2020 Summer Olympics
21st-century Chinese people